Bert Sansum (28 February 1893 – 27 December 1966) was a British wrestler. He competed at the 1924 and the 1928 Summer Olympics. Sansum was also a three-time British champion in bantamweight wrestling.

References

External links
 

1893 births
1966 deaths
Olympic wrestlers of Great Britain
Wrestlers at the 1924 Summer Olympics
Wrestlers at the 1928 Summer Olympics
British male sport wrestlers
Place of birth missing